Capitán FAP Pedro Canga Rodríguez Airport  is an airport serving Tumbes, Peru. It is the main airport of the Tumbes Region, and is run by CORPAC S.A. (Corporación Peruana de Aeropuertos y Aviación Comercial S.A.), a government organization that manages Peruvian airports. The airport is used mainly by locals and national and international travelers because of its proximity to beaches and resorts.

Airlines and destinations

See also
Transport in Peru
List of airports in Peru

References

External links 
SkyVector Aeronautical Charts
OurAirports - Tumbes

Airports in Peru
Buildings and structures in Tumbes Region